Carrie A. Lewis DelRosso (born ) is an American politician and businesswoman who served one term as a member of the Pennsylvania House of Representatives from the 33rd district from 2021 to 2022. She was the Republican nominee for Lieutenant Governor of Pennsylvania in the 2022 election, running on the party's general election ticket with Doug Mastriano.

Early life and education 
DelRosso was born in Scranton, Pennsylvania. She graduated from West Scranton High School and studied at the University of Pittsburgh.

Career before politics
From 1996 to 2006, DelRosso worked as an insurance specialist for the University of Pittsburgh Medical Center and currently runs a public relations company. She was hired by the Riverview School District as a public relations consultant in 2016, and left that position at the end of 2019, citing her other PR roles for the Penn Hills, Verona, and Plum school districts.

Political career
In 2017, DelRosso was elected to serve on the Oakmont Borough Council and was sworn in on January 2, 2018. In November 2020, she won the election to represent Pennsylvania's 33rd House district, beating then-Pennsylvania House Minority Leader Frank Dermody 51% to 49%. Following the election she resigned from the Oakmont Borough Council; her resignation was made effective on December 31, 2020.

Pennsylvania lieutenant governor campaign

Following redistricting of the state House maps, DelRosso would have been unable to run again in the 33rd district. On February 2, 2022, DelRosso announced she would be seeking the Republican nomination for Lieutenant Governor of Pennsylvania in the 2022 election. She ran televised advertisements statewide to gain recognition and later won the nomination with 25.66% of the vote.

DelRosso appeared on the general election ballot alongside gubernatorial nominee Pennsylvania State Senator Doug Mastriano. DelRosso was not Mastriano's endorsed candidate for lieutenant governor in primary election; Mastriano supported candidate Teddy Daniels who received 12% of the vote. Despite not being Mastriano's preferred candidate, DelRosso said she would work with Mastriano on initiatives such as election integrity, school choice, and energy policy. She and Mastriano ran against the Democratic nominees for governor and lieutenant governor, Pennsylvania Attorney General Josh Shapiro and Pennsylvania State Representative Austin Davis, respectively, and lost on November 8.

Political positions
DelRosso has said she is "anti-establishment". She opposed mandates related to the COVID-19 pandemic. She has promoted mail-in and absentee ballots. DelRosso criticized the 2021 United States Capitol attack for its lawlessness and violence.

Electoral history

References 

1975 births
21st-century American politicians
21st-century American women politicians
Living people
Republican Party members of the Pennsylvania House of Representatives
People from Oakmont, Pennsylvania
People from Scranton, Pennsylvania
Politicians from Scranton, Pennsylvania